The Christ's Church, Nanjing, locally known as Christ's Church, Jiangsu Road, is a Protestant church located on Jiangsu Road, in Gulou District, Nanjing, Jiangsu, China.

History 
The church traces its origins to the former "Lingguang Church", founded by Zhao Shuying in 1941. In 1946, the Chinese Christian Spiritual Seminary, which was founded by Jia Yuming, moved back to Nanjing from Chongqing and rented it as the school location. 

During the Cultural Revolution, the church was closed and reopened to the public in 1982. The church relocated to the current location in December 1999.

References 

Churches in Nanjing
1941 establishments in China
Churches completed in 1941
Tourist attractions in Nanjing
Protestant churches in China